Chaudhary Tarif Singh (चौ० तारीफ सिंह) (Shokeen),  is an Indian politician. He was elected to Lok Sabha from Outer Delhi (9th Lok Sabha : 2 December 1989 – 13 March 1991) under the Janata Dal government. He is an honest Jat leader and has been working towards upliftment of farmers and peasants, he is well appreciated and respected in Delhi and Haryana. Ch. Charan Singh, Fifth Prime Minister of India brought him into politics. He is a humble and honest Jat leader from Delhi. His granddaughter Neha is married to social worker and upcoming Jat leader Ch. Ankit Singh Mann

Political career 
In 1977, he was elected as a Pradhan Gramsabha, Village Sultanpur Mazra.

1978 - 1980 
He was Chairman of the Agriculture Produce Market Committee (APMC), Najafgarh, Delhi.

1985 - 1987 
He became President of Lok Dal Delhi Pradesh, Delhi in 1985 and held this position till 1987.

1989 - 1991 
Ch. Tarif Singh contested and won Lok Sabha elections from Delhi's Outer Delhi seat and won by a huge margin. He dedicated this victory to the people living in his constituency and worked hard for betterment of Delhi. He has been appreciated to be a common man's leader as he was always approachable by all during his term as Lok Sabha MP.

1994 
After demise of Ch. Charan Singh, he joined Indian National Congress along with Ajit Singh (politician) (son of Ch. Charan Singh). He was Vice President of Delhi Pradesh Congress Committee between 1995 and 1997.

2000 - 2003 
He served as Chairman of Swami Shraddhanand College, Alipur affiliated to University of Delhi.

2003 - Present 
Ch. Tarif Singh lives a simple life as a Social worker and a political activist. He helps the needy to the best of his abilities. He believes in the 'Simple living and high thinking' motto. People in Delhi circles appreciate him for all the great work he does in his daily life. He enjoys a huge fan base amongst people in Delhi and there have been many who have been requesting him to make a comeback to active politics.

References

External links
Official biographical sketch in Parliament of India website

Living people
Janata Dal politicians
1943 births
India MPs 1989–1991